Palapag, officially the Municipality of Palapag, is a 3rd class municipality in the province of Northern Samar, Philippines. According to the 2020 census, it has a population of 34,034 people.

It is located in the northernmost part of Samar Island.

History

Pre-Hispanic
Ages before the coming of the Spaniards, the Philippines was already settled. Each settlement was an independent kingdom known as barangay. About one hundred families consisted each barangay. Each barangay had a ruler called datu, also known as hari or raja. He exercised executive, legislative and judicial power in the barangay. During wartime, he was the commander of barangay warriors. The datu usually obtained his position by inheritance, wisdom, wealth or physical strength.

The early Filipinos had their own form of government. They had both oral and written laws. The unwritten laws were the customs which were passed down from generation to generation and the written laws were promulgated by the datus.

In Samar, there were already settlements located along the coast and the river before the Spaniards arrived. These settlements called bungto were ruled by a datu, also called the ginaopan or gindolohan. The datus who ruled the bayside settlements or alongside deep harbors were the most richest and powerful.

The society in prehispanic Samar was composed of datu, the freemen or timawa, the tuhay or mamahay which were also known as aliping namamahay in the Tagalog region, and the hayuhay or ayuway which were equivalent of the aliping sagigilid.

Provincial and municipal government 
By the 17th century, Spanish colonists numbered only a few thousand throughout the Philippines and had few incentives to settle and carve out the land in the provinces. On the Island of Samar, the land and people were distributed among the Spanish colonists under the encomienda system. A Spaniard who was trusted with encomienda was called an encomendero. He was tasked to collect tributes, recruit abled-bodied males for public services or polo and ensure the physical and spiritual well-being of the inhabitants. But because of abuses, the system was abolished.

In order to enhance their administration on the colony, the Spaniards did not abolish the old barangays and merged it into towns called pueblos and the groups of pueblos were called alcaldia or districts headed by alcalde mayor.

When the Jesuits were expelled in Samar in 1768, there were sixteen pueblos already established but only fifteen pueblos had Jesuit parish priests resident and were already divided into three residences: the east, north and the west coasts. The center of the north-east coasts referred to as Ibabao, was Palapag, while for the west coast was Catbalogan and at the same time the capital of Samar Island.  Being the capital, it was there where the provincial government personnel numbering no more than three or four Spaniards including the governor. His prime duty was to collect revenues, pay the accounts and balance the books. He had executives, judicial and legislative functions.

As of 1830, a royal order was issued substituting civilian governor by a military governor. He assumed office on 1830 as the first military governor of Samar and the number of government personnel was increased. For administrative purposes, he suggested the division of Samar into three administrative districts, the west, north and the east coasts. It was approved on 1867 in Manila and in the Council of Administration in Madrid, however it was not realized. By 1890, the Franciscans divided Samar into three vicariates, the west, north and east coasts.

On the municipal level, the pueblo was headed by a Gobernadorcillo elected annually. He was both the judicial and executive officer, the general supervisor and ensure of public order, the main collector of tributes and in charge of the repair and maintenance of public buildings and roads. In order to perform his task efficiently he had to work closely with the priest for support and visto bueno of documents. His subordinates were called cabeza de barangay who was in charge of collecting tributes and other taxes of each family. Aside from them, there were three superintendents and assistants of fields, livestock, police and lieutenants (tenientes) and police for every visita and barrio. With the increase of pueblo officials the role of the priest was reduced.

Geography
Palapag is bounded on the north by the vast Pacific Ocean, on the east by the municipality of Mapanas, on the west by the municipality of Laoang and on the south by the municipality of Catubig. The town center is located in the north-eastern part of the municipality. Its physical features are characterized by mountainous part on the east and a relatively plain on the north-western side of the municipality.

Climate

The climate falls under Type 2, no distinct dry season with a very pronounced rainy season, maximum rain period generally occur in December and January.

This climate type in Palapag plays an important rule to its agricultural economy. Although the agricultural land area is wide enough for the farmers, mostly the cultivation is being limited by the excessive rainfall and the regular sweeping of the typhoon on Samar Islands.

Barangays
Palapag is subdivided into 32 barangays.

 Asum (Poblacion)
 Bagacay
 Bangon
 Benigno S. Aquino, Jr. (Poblacion)
 Binay
 Cabariwan
 Cabatuan
 Campedico
 Capacujan
 Jangtud
 Laniwan (Poblacion)
 Mabaras
 Magsaysay
 Manajao
 Mapno
 Maragano
 Matambag
 Monbon
 Nagbobtac
 Napo
 Natawo
 Nipa
 Osmeña
 Pangpang
 Paysud
 Sangay
 Simora
 Sinalaran
 Sumoroy
 Talolora
 Tambangan (Poblacion)
 Tinampo (Poblacion)

Demographics

Economy

Transportation
The municipality is not directly connected by land to other regions of the Philippine archipelago; it still relies on the wharfs provided by the Barangay's near coastal areas (Barangay Sumoroy and Barangay Pangpang) through motorized boats on going to and from the town. It has a small port in Barangay Mapno but currently idle, no facilities yet provided for the port users.

Education
Elementary:
 Palapag Central Elementary School
 Cabatuan Elementary School

Secondary:
 Sumoroy Agro-Industrial School
 Capacujan National High School
 Cabatuan National High School
 Pangpang National High School
 Jangtud National High School

Tertiary:
Eastern Visayas Central Colleges (EVCC)
Colegio de Nuestra Seniora de la Assuncion

References

External links
 [ Philippine Standard Geographic Code]
 Philippine Census Information
 Local Governance Performance Management System

Municipalities of Northern Samar